The 47th District of the Iowa House of Representatives in the state of Iowa.

Current elected officials
Phil Thompson is the representative currently representing the district.

Past representatives
The district has previously been represented by:
 Nathan F. Sorg, 1971–1973
 Raburn G. Miller, 1973–1974
 Opal Louise Miller, 1975–1979
 Ruhl Maulsby, 1979–1983
 Myron B. Oxley, 1983–1987
 Mary Lundby, 1987–1993
 Barry Brauns, 1993–2003
 Ralph Watts, 2003–2013
 Chip Baltimore, 2013–2019
 Phil Thompson, 2019–present

References

047